Hwawon Station is an underground station of the Daegu Metro Line 1 in Dalseong County Daegu, South Korea.

The station is connected to Seolhwa–Myeonggok station via Hwawon Bridge Hajeo Tunnel. Hwawon-eup office is located right next to the station, and the station is located in the center of the Hwawon-eup and apartment complex. From this station, you can transfer to the city bus access to the Flower Garden, Sammunjin, Dasan Culture Park, and Dasan-myeon, Goryeong-gun. There is Snake Mountain near at the station, and there is also the Hwawon Bridge Underground Tunnel, and the surrounding area is slightly higher, so the station is on the deep side.

Station layout

List of exits
There are 4 exits at this station:

References

External links
 Cyber station information from Daegu Metropolitan Transit Corporation

Dalseong County
Railway stations opened in 2016
Daegu Metro stations